John Madden Football, released as John Madden American Football in Europe, is an American football video game released by Electronic Arts. Loosely based on the 1988 computer game of the same title, it was the first entry in what eventually became the yearly Madden NFL series on home consoles, initially released for the Sega Genesis in 1990. It is sometimes called Madden '90 or Madden '91 to distinguish it from subsequent entries in the series.

A Super NES version was released in 1991, which incorporated content from the second Genesis installment released during the same year (John Madden Football '92), followed by a completely reworked Amiga version in 1992.

Gameplay
The game includes various field conditions and audibles. The console versions use passwords for saves. It is played from above and behind the quarterback rather than from the side as most games of the time. As in the previous version, no actual NFL teams are included due to the lack of NFL or NFLPA licenses for authentic teams or player names.

In the 1990 Sega Genesis release, only a total of 16 teams are available. Each team was based unofficially on teams from the 1990 NFL season. The following generic teams are included, with colors based on the local NFL team: Buffalo, Miami, New England, Cincinnati, Houston, Pittsburgh, Denver, Kansas City, New York City (colors based on Giants), Philadelphia, Washington, Chicago, Minnesota, Atlanta, Los Angeles (colors based on Rams) and San Francisco. An All-Madden team is included as a bonus.

The SNES release features twenty-eight teams and the All-Madden team. Like in the Sega Genesis release, they are all generic, but each NFL city is represented and uses their respective colors (for instance, Cleveland’s team colors are orange and brown). New York and Los Angeles’ teams are again represented by the Giants’ and Rams’ colors, meaning each city is only represented once. To fill out the team roster, teams from “Oakland” and “New Jersey” were added, with the former wearing silver and black like the Raiders and the latter green and white like the Jets.

Development
Going into the project, Electronic Arts considered the title "the turning point" and "everything to us". As the company was also working on Joe Montana Football for Sega, they contracted out Park Place Productions to develop Madden. As opposed to EA's approach to the previous game, which emphasized realism, the new developers emphasized fun and arcade action. Much of the development team was made up of former Cinemaware developers who previously had worked on TV Sports: Football, a football game released the same year of the previous John Madden Football release, which, according to IGN, "stole some of EA's thunder"

Reception
Electronic Arts had only expected the Genesis version to sell around 75,000 units, but instead the title sold roughly 400,000 units. It became a killer app for the Genesis, helping the console gain market share against the NES.

Computer and Video Games reviewed the Mega Drive version John Madden American Football and gave it a 95% score, praising the realism and the sound. Sega Power gave it a 92% score.

At the 1990 Golden Joystick Awards, John Madden American Football for the Mega Drive won the award for best console game of the year (16-bit).

In 2018, The Strong National Museum of Play inducted John Madden Football to its World Video Game Hall of Fame.

References

External links
 
 

Madden NFL
1990 video games
Electronic Arts games
Super Nintendo Entertainment System games
Sega Genesis games
EA Sports games
Imagineer games
Multiplayer and single-player video games
Video games scored by Rob Hubbard
Golden Joystick Award for Game of the Year winners
World Video Game Hall of Fame
Video games developed in the United States